Veronika Linkova (born 24 June 1982) is a Russian water polo player. She participated at the 2003 World Aquatics Championships, and 2001 Women's European Water Polo Championship.

See also
 List of World Aquatics Championships medalists in water polo

References

External links
 

1982 births
Living people
Russian female water polo players
World Aquatics Championships medalists in water polo
21st-century Russian women